Hilda Kristina “Kirsti” Suonio, née Sainio, originally Kjäll (1872–1939) was a Finnish stage and film actress.

Selected filmography
 The Village Shoemakers (1923)
 Substitute Wife (1936)

References

Bibliography 
 Kääpä, Pietari: Directory of World Cinema: Finland. Intellect Books, 2012.

External links 
 

1872 births
1939 deaths
Actresses from Helsinki
People from Uusimaa Province (Grand Duchy of Finland)
Finnish film actresses
Finnish silent film actresses
Finnish stage actresses